Chingford Rugby Club is an English rugby union club based in Chingford, London.  The first XV team currently plays in London 1 North following their relegation from London & South East Premier at the end of the 2018–19 season.  The club has had many ties with players playing for notable counties/clubs such as Eastern Counties, Essex, Saracens, London Irish, Northampton Saints, England U21's and Brive.

History

The club was founded in 1928 by members of Chingford congregational church the club was originally known as “Chingford Guild Rugby Club”. A ground was loaned by a local milkman named Mr Soper adjacent to the reservoirs at Lee Valley. Members of the club then built a changing building with two changing rooms, plunge bath and water heating stove. A double Decker bus was acquired for the spectators and the players washed in a local piggery.  In 1930 the club was renamed Chingford Rugby Club and in 1945 the club was reformed using an old army hut. The original building had been destroyed during the 2nd World War on VE night. This hut was used until 1947 when the “Rendezvous Café” was used for changing. During the fifties the club moved to its previous site. The clubhouse was extended in 1960, again in 1968, and finally in 2012 by contributors to it present size.

In 2018 the club reached the highest level in its history, obtaining promotion after winning the London 1 North/London 1 South promotion play-off.

Club honours
London 2 North East champions (2): 1989–90, 2004–05
London 1 (north v south) promotion playoff winners: 2017–18

See also
 Essex RFU

References

English rugby union teams
Rugby union clubs in London
Sports clubs in England